Nathan Greaves (born 24 February 1998, Sheffield) is an English former motorcycle speedway rider.

Career
Greaves started his British speedway career for the Cradley Heathens in 2013. He raced with Swindon Robins as a fast track reserve in 2014 before joining Workington Comets for the 2014 Premier League speedway season.

After a season with the Sheffield Tigers in 2016 he signed for Wolverhampton Wolves in the SGB Premiership 2017 and Ipswich Witches for the 2017 season. He also rode for Wolves during the 2018 season before moving to Redcar Bears in 2019.

His final season was with Edinburgh Monarchs in the SGB Championship and Armadale Devils in the National League during 2021. He retired after the season on 3 September 2021.

Career honours 
2011 250cc British Under 16s Champion
2012 250cc and 500cc British Under 16s Champion
2013 500cc British Under 16s Champion
2013 National League title winner (Cradley)
2013 National League Knockout Cup winner (Cradley)
2014 National League title winner (Cradley)
2014 National League Knockout Cup winner (Cradley)
2014 National League Fours winner (Cradley)
2018 3rd place British Under-21 Final

References

External links 
Official website

1998 births
Living people
British speedway riders
Edinburgh Monarchs riders
Ipswich Witches riders
Redcar Bears riders
Sheffield Tigers riders
Wolverhampton Wolves riders